James Henry Edwards (19 February 1892 – 29 March 1952) was a New Zealand socialist, communist, political activist and salesman. He was born in London, England on 19 February 1892.

References

1892 births
1952 deaths
New Zealand activists
New Zealand socialists
New Zealand communists
Unsuccessful candidates in the 1931 New Zealand general election
British emigrants to New Zealand